Kuafu is a giant in Chinese mythology who wished to capture the Sun.  He was a grandson of Houtu.

Story
One day, Kuafu decided to chase and catch the Sun. He followed the Sun from the East to the West, draining the Yellow River and the Wei River (all rivers and lakes crossing his path) to quench his burning thirst. However, the big rivers were also unable to quench his thirst, and as he searched for more water, he eventually died of dehydration. The wooden club he was carrying grew into a vast forest of peach trees called the Deng Forest.

In one version, Kuafu turns into a mountain range.

In modern Chinese usage, the story of Kuafu chasing the Sun is used to describe a person who is brave and optimistic and willing to overcome all the obstacles to reach the goal.

Tribe
"Kuafu" can also be taken to refer to his people, the Kuafu-shi or "Clan of Kuafu". Since "shi" can mean both "clan" and "maiden name", as well as serving as a masculine honorific like "mister" or "sir", it is sometimes used in reference to his people or the individual.

During the battle of Banquan, Chi You's tribes allied themselves with the Kuafu tribe and the Sanmiao tribe and attacked the Yan Emperor's tribe, driving them into the lands of the Yellow Emperor.

See also
Icarus, comparative character in Greek mythology 
Kuafu project, Chinese space program named after Kuafu

References
Yang, Lihui, et al. (2005). Handbook of Chinese Mythology. New York: Oxford University Press.

Notes

Chinese giants